Carabus trichothorax is a species of black-coloured ground beetle in the Carabinae subfamily that is endemic to Sichuan, China.

References

trichothorax
Beetles described in 1997